Elmhurst, New York may refer to:
Elmhurst, Chautauqua County, New York
Elmhurst, Queens, New York City